Fragneto l'Abate (locally ) is a comune (municipality) in the Province of Benevento in the Italian region Campania, located about  northeast of Naples and about  north of Benevento.

Fragneto l'Abate borders the following municipalities: Campolattaro, Circello, Fragneto Monforte, Pesco Sannita, Reino.

References

Cities and towns in Campania